The Raglai people are a Chams related ethnic group mainly living in Khánh Hòa Province of South Central Coast, and Ninh Thuận Province of South East of Vietnam, with a population around 146,613 in 2019.

The word Raglai means Forest in the Roglai language. They speak a language in the Malayo-Polynesian language family.

History
The Raglai people have lived in the high and rugged mountains in the west of Khánh Hòa, Ninh Thuận and Bình Thuận provinces, next to the Cham people in the South Central Coast plains  for a very long time. The two groups of Cham and Raglai have had a deep relationship during their history. The thousand-year-old remaining proverb "Cam sa-ai Raglai adei" (Cham oldest sister, Raglai youngest sister) proved their blood relations.

Culture
They sing Akha Jukha, play Saraken and Chapi.

Notable people
 Pinăng Tắc - Ama Tắc (1910 - 1987), a Việt Cộng guerrilla of Ninh Thuận Province Command, who led the Raglai people during First Indochina War and Second Indochina War, was awarded the Hero of the People's Armed Forces on May 5, 1965.

See also
Roglai language
Jarai people
Champa
Degar
Tây Nguyên
FULRO

References

Hải Liên. 2002. Trang phục cố truyền Raglai. Hanoi: Nhà xuất bản Đại Học Quốc Gia Hà nội.
Nguyễn Hữu Bài, et al. 2014. Văn hóa dân gian Raglai ở Khanh Hòa. Hồ Chí Minh City: Nhà xuất bản văn hóa - văn nghệ. 

Ethnic groups in Vietnam